Red Like the Sky is a 2005 Italian  coming-of-age drama film written and directed by Cristiano Bortone and starring Luca Capriotti and Paolo Sassanelli. It is based on the childhood experiences of sound editor Mirco Mencacci.

The film  won the Audience Awards at the São Paulo International Film Festival and at the Sydney Film Festival.
It also won the David di Donatello of the Youth.

Plot 
In 1970, ten-year-old Tuscan boy Mirco loses his sight following an accident with his father's rifle.

The parents are forced to make him attend an institution for the blind in Genoa. There, unable to use braille, he finds an old tape recorder and manages to invent fairy tales made only of noises and narration. In the meantime, he meets Francesca, the daughter of the concierge of the house next to them, although they could not meet. Mirco will increasingly involve all the other blind children by making them understand how much they are worth and how similar they are to all the other kids.

In the end the teacher organizes a play created by the kids, and all parents are impressed by it. Mirco's parents eventually decide to bring him home for the summer holidays.

At the opening it is said that the film is based on a true story, and before the closing credits we read: "Mirco left school at 16 years old. Although he has never recovered his sight, today he is one of the most recognized sound editors of Italian cinema."

Cast  
 
 Luca Capriotti as Mirco
 Paolo Sassanelli as Don Giulio
 Marco Cocci as Ettore 
 Francesca Maturanza as Francesca
 Rosanna Gentili as Mirco's mother
 Simone Colombari as Mirco's father
 Simone Gullì as Felice
 Giusi Merli as Mirco's teacher

Awards 
2007 - David di Donatello
 David Giovani Award
San Paolo Intl. Film Festival
 Audience Award: Best foreign film
Sydney International Film Festival
 Best Film: Youth Jury Award
International Festival of film for children and young adults (Hamedan City, Iran)
 Best Film, Best Script, CIFEJ prizes
Montreal Int. L Youth Film Festival - Fifem
 Grand Prix de Montreal, Prix Place aux Familles
 European Youth Film Festival of Flanders
 Audience AwardXXXIV Premio internazionale Flaiano
 Audience Award
Schilingel children Film Festival (Germany)
Best Film
Young Public Award 
Best Actor
Palm Beach Film Festival
 Best film 
 Best Director
Syracuse International Film Festival
Best Feature Film Award, Best Music Award
Best Writing Award
Special Jury Citation for Children Acting

See also  
 List of Italian films of 2005

References

External links

2000s coming-of-age drama films
Italian coming-of-age drama films
Films about blind people
Coming-of-age films based on actual events
Films directed by Cristiano Bortone
2005 drama films
2005 films
2000s Italian films